George Rushton (October 1881 – 1964) was an English footballer who played on the wing for Burslem Port Vale, Barrow, Brighton & Hove Albion, Hull City, Swindon Town, Brentford, and Goole Town at the start of the 20th century.

Career
Rushton played for Leek Broughs, before joining Burslem Port Vale in June 1901. He scored his first goal in the English Football League in a 3–0 win over Leicester Fosse at the Athletic Ground on 12 October. He was a regular in the first team until losing his place in March 1902. He scored five goals in 20 Second Division appearances and scored one goal in three FA Cup games in the 1901–02 season. He joined Barrow in the summer of 1902, but re-signed with Port Vale in January 1903. He played the last two games of the season, and scored in a 2–1 defeat to Manchester United at Old Trafford on 18 April and then bagged another goal two days later in a 2–0 win over Barnsley. He moved on to Brighton & Hove Albion, later playing for Hull City – where he is credited for scoring the first two recorded goals in that team's history - Swindon Town (in two spells), Brentford and Goole Town.

Career statistics

References

Footballers from Stoke-on-Trent
English footballers
Association football wingers
Port Vale F.C. players
Barrow A.F.C. players
Brighton & Hove Albion F.C. players
Hull City A.F.C. players
Swindon Town F.C. players
Brentford F.C. players
Goole Town F.C. players
English Football League players
Southern Football League players
1880s births
1964 deaths